Mendyanovo (Mändän) is a rural locality (a selo) and the administrative center of Mendyanovsky Selsoviet, Alsheyevsky District, Bashkortostan, Russia. The population was 412 as of 2010. There are 4 streets.

Geography 
Mendyanovo is located 30 km southwest of Rayevsky (the district's administrative centre) by road. Staraya Vasilyevka is the nearest rural locality.

References 

Rural localities in Alsheyevsky District